, built for P&O in 1911 to expand its Blue Anchor Line subsidiary. Requisitioned as a troopship in the First World War. On 25 April 1917 a German submarine torpedoed her in the English Channel. All her passengers and crew were rescued and she was taken in tow, but she sank the next day.

Two ships of the Royal Australian Navy have been named HMAS Ballarat, for the city of Ballarat, Victoria.
 , a Bathurst-class corvette serving from 1940 to 1947
 , an Anzac-class frigate commissioned in 2004 and active as of 2019

Battle honours
Three battle honours are carried by ships named HMAS Ballarat:
 Pacific 1941–45
 New Guinea 1942–44
 Okinawa 1945

References

Royal Australian Navy ship names